Bober is a surname. Notable people with the surname include:

Anton Bober (born 1982), former Russian football midfielder
Chris Bober (born 1976), former American football offensive lineman.
Harry Bober (1915–1988), American art historian and professor, specializing in Medieval history. 
Phyllis Pray Bober (1920–2002), American art historian and professor, specializing in Renaissance art and culinary history. 
Richard Bober
Robert Bober
Ryszard Bober (born 1956), Polish politician.
Stanislas Bober (1930–1975), French professional road bicycle racer.

See also
Johann von Böber, German teacher, entomologist and botanist

Surnames from nicknames